Kyle Smith (born July 16, 1980), better known by his stage name Cecil Otter, is a rapper and producer based in Minneapolis, Minnesota. He is a founding member of the indie hip hop collective Doomtree.

History
Cecil Otter's False Hopes was released on Doomtree in 2005.

He released his first solo album, Rebel Yellow, on Doomtree in 2008. It was re-released on Strange Famous Records in 2009.

In 2011, Cecil Otter released 13 Chambers, a mashup album blending Wu-Tang Clan and Fugazi, with Swiss Andy as Wugazi.

In 2012, he stated that he is currently working on his second solo album, Porcelain Revolver.

Discography

Studio albums
 Cecil Otter's False Hopes (2005)
 Rebel Yellow (2008)

EPs
 Falsehopes (2002) (with P.O.S)
 False Hopes: Hung Over Seas (2003)
 False Hopes Mega! (2003) (with P.O.S)
 Dear Echo (2016)

Wugazi
 13 Chambers (2011)

Guest appearances
 Dessa - "Everything Floats" from False Hopes (2005)
 Sims - "Dreamsleep" and "No Homeowners" from Lights Out Paris (2005)
 Mel Gibson and the Pants - "Beat It Loose" from W/ Guitar (2005)
 P.O.S - "Low Light Low Life" from Never Better (2009)
 Mixed Blood Majority - "Free Up" from Mixed Blood Majority (2013)
 Sage Francis - "Let Em Come Redux" from Sick to D(eat)h (2013)

Productions
 Sims - "Roll Down" from False Hopes XIV (2009)
 Dessa - "Mineshaft II" from A Badly Broken Code (2010)
 Astronautalis - "Lift the Curse" from This Is Our Science (2011)
 Sims - "Hey You (Hidden track)" from Bad Time Zoo (2011)
 P.O.S - "Wanted Wasted" and "Piano Hits" from We Don't Even Live Here (2012)
 Sage Francis - "Pressure Cooker" and "Dead Man's Float" from Copper Gone (2014)

References

External links
 
 Cecil Otter on Doomtree

1980 births
American hip hop record producers
American male rappers
Doomtree members
Living people
Musicians from Minneapolis
Rappers from Minneapolis
21st-century American rappers
Hopkins High School alumni